The 1928 Stanford football team represented Stanford University in the 1928 college football season. Under fifth-year head coach  Stanford played its home games on campus at Stanford Stadium and were members of the Pacific Coast Conference. The team was ranked No. 4 in the nation in the Dickinson System ratings released in December 1928.

After playing in the Rose Bowl for the last two seasons, and three of the last four, Stanford did not play a postseason game, but did end its season on a high note with a shutout over Army before 86,000 at

Schedule

References

External links
 Sports Reference – 1928 Stanford football schedule

Stanford
Stanford Cardinal football seasons
Stanford football